The Trouble with the Truth is a 2012 American romantic drama film written and directed by Jim Hemphill. Starring John Shea and Lea Thompson as two divorcees meeting after their daughter's (Danielle Harris) engagement, the film follows their conversation over dinner as they reassess their life and relationship. The film has drawn comparison with Richard Linklater's Before Sunrise and Before Sunset, and Louis Malle's My Dinner with Andre for its minimalist plot, with Roger Ebert noting that "it is a very small movie with very deep feelings".

Cast
Lea Thompson as Emily
John Shea as Robert
Danielle Harris as Jenny
Keri Lynn Pratt as Heather
Rainy Kerwin as Staci
Ira Heiden as Restaurant Host

References

External links
 
 
 

American romantic drama films
2010s English-language films
2012 films
2012 romantic drama films
American independent films
2012 independent films
2010s American films